The Best Jockey ESPY Award, known alternatively as the Jockey of the Year ESPY Award, has been presented annually since 1994 to the thoroughbred horse racing jockey, irrespective of nationality or gender, adjudged to be the best of those riding in the United States in a given calendar year.

Between 1994 and 2004, the award voting panel comprised variously fans; sportswriters and broadcasters, sports executives, and retired sportspersons, termed collectively experts; and ESPN personalities, but balloting thereafter has been exclusively by fans over the Internet from amongst choices selected by the ESPN Select Nominating Committee.

Through the 2001 iteration of the ESPY Awards, ceremonies were conducted in February of each year to honor achievements over the previous calendar year; awards presented thereafter are conferred in June and reflect performance from the June previous. The award was not awarded in 2020 due to the COVID-19 pandemic.

List of winners

See also
Eclipse Award for Outstanding Jockey
Eclipse Award for Outstanding Apprentice Jockey

Notes

References

ESPY Awards
Horse racing awards